Severe Tropical Cyclone Glenda was among the strongest tropical cyclones to threaten Western Australia, though it weakened considerably before landfall and moved ashore in a lightly populated region. It began as a tropical low on 15 March in the Gulf of Carpentaria. The precursor disturbance drifted over Top End and later across the northeastern portion of Western Australia, and after emerging into the Indian Ocean it strengthened into a tropical storm. Aided by favourable environmental conditions, Glenda rapidly intensified to reach Category 5 status on the Australian cyclone scale, and with a peak intensity of 910 mbar it was among the strongest cyclones on record within the Australia region. On 30 March it moved ashore near Onslow as a Category 3 cyclone, and the next day it degenerated into a remnant tropical low over land.

The precursor disturbance produced heavy rainfall in the Kimberley region of Western Australia, causing record flooding and some road damage. Minor damage was reported at the final landfall of Glenda. Due to the sparse population and preparations made, the cyclone was not responsible for any deaths or injuries. However, its name was later retired from the list of tropical cyclone names.

Glenda is also tied with Yagi which became the most intense tropical cyclone in worldwide in 2006.

Meteorological history

On 15 March, a tropical disturbance developed in the south-western Gulf of Carpentaria. It moved westward, drifting across Top End, and it exited into the Joseph Bonaparte Gulf on 22 March. Environmental conditions favored intensification as an anticyclone developed over the storm, which provided good outflow and low vertical wind shear. Initially, the primary inhibiting factor was land interaction. After executing a small loop over water, the disturbance continued westward, crossing over the northern portion of Western Australia before emerging into the Indian Ocean on 26 March. It began tracking west-southwestward just offshore of the Kimberley coastline, and its convection quickly concentrated. At 0000 UTC on 27 March, the Joint Typhoon Warning Center (JTWC) classified it as Tropical Cyclone 20S.

Upon reaching open waters, Glenda quickly intensified, and midday on 27 March the BoM upgraded it to tropical cyclone status, or the equivalence of a minimal hurricane. Shortly thereafter, the JTWC followed suit by upgrading it to cyclone status just 12 hours after first warning on the storm. The track turned south westward around a steering ridge over Australia, aided by a mid-latitude trough. Its peak intensity of 910 mbar was tied for the fifth most intense tropical cyclone on record in the Australian basin.

Initially, Cyclone Glenda was forecast to intensify further. However, a gradual increase in vertical shear caused the eye to become disorganised, with land interaction contributing to further weakening. The BoM maintained Glenda as a Category 5 cyclone until 29 March, and initially it was forecast to turn southward to move ashore near the populated region of Karratha at high tide. Glenda made landfall near the less populated town of Onslow at around 10pm WST (1400 UTC) on 30 March. The cyclone had weakened to a marginal Category 3 at the time of landfall. The JTWC issued its final warning on Glenda shortly after it moved ashore. The cyclone turned south and south-south-eastward and rapidly weakened over land in an area of increasing wind shear, and early on 31 March the BoM downgraded Glenda to a tropical low.

Preparations, impact and aftermath

The precursor system dropped heavy rainfall on 23 March in the eastern Kimberley in the state of Western Australia. The rainfall led to record flooding in the area; the flooding washed out several roads near Kununurra, including a portion of the Great Northern Highway. Six people were evacuated due to the flooding.

Offshore, the threat of Glenda prompted officials to close oil, representing a lack of production of 154,000 barrels of oil. Additionally, natural gas fields were closed, and several ports along the coastline were shut down during the passage of the storm. Prior to the storm's landfall, officials issued a Red Alert for several communities. Storm shelters were opened in Karratha and Onslow, while a few hundred people evacuated along the coastline.

Glenda made landfall near Onslow, where sustained winds reached . The rainfall flooded several roads. The winds downed several trees and power lines, which left about 2,000 people in Karratha without electricity; the power outage was quickly repaired. Several windows at the hospital in Onslow were broken, resulting in some minor water damage. Overall damage was minor, and no deaths or injuries were reported, which was credited to the storm's weakening and preparations in the landfall area. In all, damages from the storm amounted to A$1.2 million (US$965,000). The disruption to shipping companies resulted in economic losses of A$30 million (US$24.1 million). Oil companies reported a loss of 500 tonnes during the economic quarter due to the cyclone. The Onslow Salt company reported upwards of A$20 million (US$16 million) in lost revenue.

Following the storm, residents and companies affected by the storm were allowed to file insurance claims. About A$240,000 (US$193,000) was filed in repair claims for council buildings and A$69,000 (US$55,000) in airport insurance. About A$99,000 (US$79,000) and A$300,000 (US$241,000) was provided in financial support for television and broadcasting infrastructure and aerodrome infrastructure respectively.

The Bureau of Meteorology retired the name Glenda following its usage.

See also

Geography of Western Australia
List of the most intense tropical cyclones

References

External links

2005–06 Australian region cyclone season
2006 in Australia
Retired Australian region cyclones
Category 5 Australian region cyclones
Tropical cyclones in Western Australia
Glenda
Tropical cyclones in the Northern Territory
2000s in Western Australia
2000s in the Northern Territory